"Arguing with Thermometers" is a single by British rock band Enter Shikari from their 2012 album A Flash Flood of Colour. The song was included on a 5-track EP released via iTunes along with a music video and remixes.

Music video
The music video stars the members of the band working in a newsroom, Reynolds is the newsreader, Rolfe the weatherman and Clewlow and Batten operate cameras. The band leave the studio and then are seen performing outside by a road and interviewing businessmen on the street. The video was released on the band's official YouTube page on 14 January 2012. The video was directed and edited by Raul Gonzo.

Track listing

Band members
Roughton "Rou" Reynolds – lead vocals, synthesizer, keyboards, programming
Chris Batten – bass guitar, backing vocals
Liam "Rory" Clewlow – guitar, backing vocals
Rob Rolfe – drums, percussion, backing vocals

References

Enter Shikari songs
2012 singles
2011 songs